Headquake is the second album of Eldritch, released in 1997. Headquake is dedicated to the memory of Luigi Tarantola (1940–1995).

Track listing
Ghoulish Gift" - 6:51
The Last Embrace" - 6:44
Lord of an Empty Place" - 5:31
Sometimes in Winter" - 6:20
At the Restless Sea" - 7:01
Salome's Dance" - 5:28
Erase" - 6:08
The Quest(ion)" - 5:27
Clockwork Bed" - 5:29
"Dawn of the Dying" - 6:39

References 

1997 albums
Eldritch (band) albums